The Internet Press Guild (IPG) is an Internet-based professional organization for technology journalists. It was originally formed in 1996 to help generalist, non-technical journalists understand and write about the Web and other Internet technology topics. More recently, it has mainly become an active, private forum for its members to discuss professional topics.

About
The IPG presents itself as, "A professional organization promoting excellence in journalism about the Internet and technology. Critical to the guild is a private mailing list that connects the editors, writers, and analysts in the Internet press community."

As veteran freelance journalist and IPG member Pam Baker put it in 2009:

History
The Guild descended from the USENET group alt.internet.media-coverage. In the mid-1990s, the journalists who relied on the group became frustrated by the disruptive behavior of a few group members. Several members, including Esther Schindler and Steven J. Vaughan-Nichols, proposed moving their discussions to an invitation-only email list.

As Baker described it in 2009:

On April 5, 1996, the IPG announced its formation in a press release with the byline of Vaughan-Nichols—now named IPG chairman. The release described the Guild:

As described by Vaughan-Nichols, the IPG was originally formed to help generalist, non-technical journalists understand and write about the Web and other Internet technology topics. More recently, it has mainly become an active, private forum for its members to discuss professional topics.

ACLU award
The IPG and its members are recipients of the Civil Liberties Award from the ACLU Foundation, as part of the fight to prevent censorship through the ultimately failed Communications Decency Act of 1996.

See also
 Bruce Byfield
 Mary Jo Foley
 David Gewirtz
 Ed Bott
 Ross Greenberg – a founding member
 Tristan Louis – a founding member
 Robin "Roblimo" Miller
 Jason Perlow
 Chris J. Preimesberger

References

External links
 Internet Press Guild website

Journalism-related professional associations